Raj Bahadur (born 5 October 1993) is an Indian cricketer. He made his first-class debut for Services in the 2016–17 Ranji Trophy on 13 October 2016.

References

External links
 

1993 births
Living people
Indian cricketers
Services cricketers
Cricketers from Allahabad